Jay Baumgardner is an American record producer, engineer and mixer. He has worked on albums by The Regulators, Seether, Superheist, Ugly Kid Joe, Bush, Helmet, Sevendust, Papa Roach, Endwell, Coal Chamber, Drowning Pool, Godsmack, Three Days Grace, P.O.D., New Found Glory, Spineshank, Alien Ant Farm and Orgy.

His most recent work is producing the Superheist album Ghosts of the Social Dead, which was released on October 28, 2016.

References

External links
Jay Baumgardner official website
Interview, HitQuarters Apr 2005

American record producers
Year of birth missing (living people)
Living people
American audio engineers